Tyro is an unincorporated community in Tate County, Mississippi, United States.

Tyro is the birthplace of singer Al Hibbler, who produced multiple best selling songs.

Tyro's name originated from the English word tyro, which also means "beginner" or "novice".

References

Unincorporated communities in Tate County, Mississippi
Unincorporated communities in Mississippi
Memphis metropolitan area